For the Summer is the first summer special album by South Korean-Chinese girl group WJSN. It was released on June 4, 2019, by Starship Entertainment and distributed by Kakao M. It contains a total of five songs, including the lead single "Boogie Up".

Background and release 
On May 19, 2019, WJSN revealed through its official social media accounts that the group would release a special album on June 4, 2019.

On the day of the album's release, the music video of the lead single "Boogie Up" was also released.

Commercial performance 
For the Summer debuted at number one on South Korea's Gaon Album Chart on the week dated June 8, 2019, becoming the group's first number one album in the country. It ranked at number seventy-one on the Year-End chart with 78,555 copies sold in 2019.

The lead single "Boogie Up" peaked at number 133 on the Gaon Digital Chart and at number 60 on the Billboard K-pop Hot 100.

Tracklisting

Charts

Weekly charts

Year-end charts

Awards and nominations

Music program wins

Release history

References 

K-pop EPs
Korean-language EPs
Cosmic Girls EPs
Starship Entertainment EPs
2019 EPs